Virginia's 17th Senate district is one of 40 districts in the Senate of Virginia. It has been represented by Republican Bryce Reeves since his 2011 victory over incumbent Democrat Edd Houck.

Geography
District 17 stretches from Fredericksburg in the east to the suburbs of Charlottesville in Albemarle County in the west, covering all of Orange County and parts of Culpeper County, Louisa County, and Spotsylvania County in between.

The district overlaps with Virginia's 1st, 5th, and 7th congressional districts, and with the 25th, 28th, 30th, 54th, 55th, 56th, 57th, 58th, and 88th districts of the Virginia House of Delegates.

Recent election results

2019

2015

2011

Federal and statewide results in District 17

Historical results
All election results below took place prior to 2011 redistricting, and thus were under different district lines.

2007

2003

1999

1995

References

Virginia Senate districts
Albemarle County, Virginia
Culpeper County, Virginia
Fredericksburg, Virginia
Louisa County, Virginia
Orange County, Virginia
Spotsylvania County, Virginia